Olayinka Olusola Omigbodun is the first Nigerian female professor of psychiatry. She is Professor, College of Medicine, University of Ibadan, Ibadan, Nigeria. Also, she is the first female provost of the College of Medicine, University of Ibadan.

Early life and education 
Olayinka is daughter of late Lt. Col Victor Banjo. She attended St. Louis Grammar School, Ibadan and the International School Ibadan for her Ordinary and Advanced Levels. She began a career in Child and Adolescent Psychiatry and mental health in 1986 at the University College Hospital (UCH), Ibadan. She had further residency training in General Psychiatry and Child and Adolescent Psychiatry at the Lancaster Moor Hospital, Lancaster also at the Queen’s Park Hospital, Blackburn, in the United Kingdom. She also had training in Family Therapy at the Department of Family Studies, University of Pennsylvania, Philadelphia and was also a visiting scholar at the University of Pennsylvania's Bipolar Research Unit. She studied at the Nuffield Institute for Health, University of Leeds where she had her Masters in Public Health in 1999. Through the University of Ibadan MacArthur Foundation-funded Staff Development Programme. She furthered her studies in Child and Adolescent Psychiatry at the Greenwood Institute for Child Health, University of Leicester, UK in 2004.

Employments and positions 
 She is a professor at the College of Medicine, University of Ibadan, Ibadan, Nigeria
 She is also a consultant and head of Department of Child and Adolescent Psychiatry, University College Hospital, Ibadan, Nigeria

Publications (articles and journals) 
Olayinka has written numerous articles for both local and international journals. Some of which are:
 Omigbodun O.O., Gureje O., Gater R., Ikuesan B. A., Adebayo E. (1996) Psychiatric Morbidity in a Nigerian Paediatric Primary Care Service: A Comparison of Two Screening Instruments. Social Psychiatry and Psychiatric Epidemiology, Vol 31, No 3/4, 186-193
 Omigbodun, O.O., Adebayo, E. and Gureje, O. (1999) Detection of Childhood Mental Health Problems by Doctors working in a Primary Care Service.  Nigerian Postgraduate Medical Journal,  Vol 6, 1, 1-4.
 Omigbodun O.O. (2001) A cost effective model for increasing access to mental health care at the primary care level in Nigeria. The Journal of Mental Health Policy and Economics Vol 4, No 3, 133-139
 Omigbodun O.O. (2003) Mental health services for children in Nigeria. Where should the focus be? Archives of Ibadan Medicine, Vol 4. No 1, 12
 Omigbodun O.O, Gureje O. (2004) Factor Analysis of the Children’s Behaviour Questionnaire (Rutter Scale A2) in a Nigerian Paediatric Primary Care Population. South African Journal of Psychiatry Vol 10. No 1, 17-20
 Omigbodun O.O., Bella T T (2004) Obstetric risk factors and subsequent mental health problems in a child and adolescent clinic population in Nigeria. Tropical Journal of Obstetrics and Gynaecology, Vol 21. No 1: 15-20
 Omigbodun O. O..(2004) Psychosocial issues in a child and adolescent psychiatric clinic population in Nigeria. Social Psychiatry and Psychiatric Epidemiology Vol 39 No 8, 667-72
 Omigbodun O. O., Omigbodun A. O. (2004) Unmet need for sexuality education among adolescent girls in Southwest Nigeria: A qualitative analysis. African Journal of Reproductive Health.Vol 8. No 3, 27-37
 Omigbodun O. O., Onibokun A.,.Yusuf O B,. Odukogbe AA, Omigbodun A O. (2004) Stressors and counseling needs of undergraduate nurses in Ibadan, Nigeria.  Journal of Nursing Education. Vol 43. No 9, 412-5
 Omigbodun O. O., Babalola O.(2004) Psychosocial dynamics of psychoactive substance misuse  among Nigerian adolescents. Annals of African Medicine Vol 3. No 3, 111-115
 Omigbodun AO, Omigbodun OO. (2004) Medical Audit: A veritable tool for improving standards in clinical practice. Annals of African Medicine, 3 (3):146-149
 Omigbodun OO (2006) Psychosocial attributes of orphaned youths in Ibadan Metropolis: Implications for reproductive health Tropical Journal of Obstetrics and Gynaecology, Vol 23. No 1: 54-62
 Omigbodun O.O., Odukogbe A.A., Omigbodun A.O., Yusuf O.B., Bella T.T., Olayemi O. (2006) Stressors and Psychological Symptoms in Students of Medicine and Allied Health Professions in Nigeria. Social Psychiatry and Psychiatric Epidemiology, 40:1-7
 Omigbodun O., Bella T., Dogra N., Simoyan O., (2007) Training Health Professionals for Child and Adolescent Mental Health Care in Nigeria: A Qualitative Analysis. Child and Adolescent Mental Health 12 (3): 132-135.
 Obindo J. T,. Omigbodun OO., (2007) The validation of Edinburgh Postpartum Depressions Scale (EPDS) in North Central Nigeria. Journal of Medicine in the Tropics. Vol 9 (2): 29-40

References 

Year of birth missing (living people)
Living people
Nigerian psychiatrists
Academic staff of the University of Ibadan
Alumni of the University of Leeds
Yoruba women physicians
Nigerian women medical doctors
Nigerian women academics
Yoruba women academics
University of Pennsylvania alumni
20th-century births
International School, Ibadan alumni
History of women in Nigeria